The South Korean idol group Sechs Kies (also known as SechsKies or Sechskies) has held four tours and four fan meetings since their debut in 1997.

Tours

1997 - 1999 Tours

2016: Yellow Note Tours

2017: Yellowkies Day & 20th Anniversary Tours

Sechskies 2018 Concert : Now, Here, Again

Sechskies 2020 Concert [Access]

References

External links
Official Site
YG Entertainment

Sechs Kies
Sechs Kies
SechsKies